SFN may refer to:

Short filename, the 8.3 filename limitation of the DOS computer operating system
SFN Group, Inc., a North American temporary work agency
Single-frequency network, a broadcast network where several transmitters simultaneously send the same signal over the same frequency channel
Small Fiber Neuropathy
Society for Neuroscience,  a professional society headquartered in Washington, D.C.
Subcutaneous fat necrosis of the newborn, a medical condition occurring in newborns
Protein stratifin